Natalius was a figure in early church history who is sometimes considered to be the first antipope of Rome.

The only information about Natalius is a quote from an unnamed earlier writer by Eusebius, telling of a 3rd-century priest who accepted the bishopric of the Adoptionists, which was seen as a "heretical group" in Rome. Natalius soon repented and tearfully begged Pope Zephyrinus to receive him into communion.

See also 
 List of papal elections
 Papal conclave
 Papal selection before 1059

Notes 

Year of birth unknown
Year of death unknown
Antipopes
2nd-century Romans
2nd-century antipopes
Year of birth uncertain